The Altair  was a solid-fuel rocket with a fiberglass casing, initially developed for use as the third stage of Vanguard rockets in 1959. It was manufactured by Allegany Ballistics Laboratory (ABL) as the X-248. It was also sometimes called the Burner 1.

Altair
The X-248 was one of two third-stage designs used during Project Vanguard. Early launches used a stage developed by the Grand Central Rocket Company, but later launches used the X-248 which enabled the Vanguard to launch more massive payloads.

The X-248 was used as the second stage of some early Thor flights. These vehicles were designated "Thor-Burner".

Altairs were used as the third stage of early Delta rockets.

The fourth stage of the Scout rocket also used the "Altair" stage.

Altair 2

The Altair 2 (X-258) Thiokol solid rocket engine first flew in 1963 and was the kick stage motor for Delta D, Scout A, Scout X-4, and Orbiting Vehicle satellites. It was retired in 1973.

See also 
 Algol (rocket stage)
 Castor (rocket stage)

References 

Rocket stages
Solid-fuel rockets